Otto Ramón Sonnenholzner Sper (locally , ; born 19 March 1983) is an Ecuadorian radio broadcaster, politician, and economist who served as the 50th Vice President of Ecuador from December 2018 to July 2020.

Biography 
Otto was born in Guayaquil on March 19, 1983, to father Ramón Sonnenholzner and mother Rosa Elena Sper. After studying social sciences, communication and international economics in Ecuador, Germany, and Spain, he became speaker and general manager of Tropicana radio, then president of the Ecuadorian Association of broadcasting (AER). He teaches at the University of Guayaquil.

He has three children with his wife, Claudia Salem Barakat.

After the resignation of María Alejandra Vicuña in December 2018, and at the proposal of President Lenín Moreno, the National Assembly of Ecuador entrusted him with the office of vice-president.

On July 7, 2020, Otto resigned from his position as Vice President due to the 2019-20 coronavirus pandemic outbreak in Guayaquil. He left office in the middle of several corruption scandals affecting Moreno's administration.

He signed the Madrid Charter, a document drafted by the far-right Spanish party Vox that describes left-wing groups as enemies of Ibero-America involved in a "criminal project" that are "under the umbrella of the Cuban regime".

References 

21st-century Ecuadorian economists
Ecuadorian people of German descent
1983 births
Vice presidents of Ecuador
Living people
People from Guayaquil
Ecuadorian people of Lebanese descent
Signers of the Madrid Charter